Dr. Ram Manohar Lohia Hospital  (formerly known as Willingdon Hospital) is a government hospital in New Delhi, India.

The hospital was founded, with 54 beds, in 1932 by the British Raj for their own government staff. In 1954, in the newly independent India, control of the hospital was transferred to the Central Government's Ministry of Health and Family Welfare. It was renamed in 1970s after Dr. Ram Manohar Lohia, the most important proponent of socialist ideology in India.

It is a Central Government hospitals because of its well-positioned location, a seventy-one bed Nursing Home for Central Government Health Scheme beneficiaries, and extensive subspecialty care. The hospital also has emergency services and has current plans for the construction of a 16-Storey Doctor's Hostel and a new MBBS building on its free land.

Annually, the hospital provides services to about 1.2 million patients as OPD cases, admits about 46,000 patients and attends about 150,000 emergency patients; it has 1420 beds. The hospital conducts about 10,000 CT scans, 2,000 MRI scans, 200,000 X-ray cases, 2.8 million laboratory tests, 25,000 ultrasound scans, and about 9,000 major and 40,000 minor operations per year. The hospital runs daily separate CGHS OPDs for CGHS beneficiaries.

The hospital started MBBS course from 2019 session with 100 seats under the aegis of Atal Bihari Vajpayee Institute of Medical Sciences.

The Hospital also has plans to increase the number of beds to about 3000 exceeding that of Safdarjung Hospital.

See also
 Ram Manohar Lohia
 Atal Bihari Vajpayee Institute of Medical Sciences
 Hospitals in India
 Rashtrapati Bhavan

References 

Hospitals in Delhi
Memorials to Ram Manohar Lohia
1932 establishments in India
Hospitals established in 1932